Daily Mashriq (Pashto: روﺯنامه مشرق) is an Urdu-language daily newspaper published from Peshawar, provincial capital of Khyber Pakhtunkhwa. The newspaper was founded in 1963 by Inayat Ullah Khan. Muhammad Iqbal Khawaja is the current Chief Editor of Daily Mashriq, Lahore.

History 

In 1964, the newspaper was nationalized by the military regime of Ayub Khan and subsequently, it became part of the National Press Trust (NPT), which was established to manage nationalized independent newspapers in order free media.

In 1967, the NPT re-launched the paper from Peshawar and another edition from Karachi. In 1972, the third edition from Quetta was added. It remained in government hands until the government of Benazir Bhutto abolished the NPT in 1994 and privatized all newspapers.

Contributors 

 Intizar Hussain
 Hasan Abidi

See also 
 List of newspapers in Pakistan

References

External links
 Mashriq Official web Site
 Mashriq 
 Mashriq Newspaper

Daily newspapers published in Pakistan
Urdu-language newspapers published in Pakistan
Mass media in Peshawar
1963 establishments in Pakistan
Nationalisation in Pakistan